The following products could be described as hallmarks of Croatian trade. Croatiastreet awards its own quality seal to the best Croatian products every year. Croatian Chamber of Economy confers the  seal to Croatian products and services that undergo rigorous assessments to be recognised as a result of innovation, research and development by Croatian people and enterprises.

Wines

Croatian wines (vino, pl. vina in Croatian) have gained in quality, but are still largely unknown to the world wine market. It is a matter of the developing Croatian economy to make these wines more popular in the world, and it is up to Croatian wine producers to start large-scale production for international markets.

White wines
 Bogdanuša
 Debit (grape)
 Graševina
 Grk Bijeli
 Kujundžuša – from the region of Imotski
 Malvasia Dubrovačka
 Malvazija Istarska
 Pošip
 Pušipel
 Traminac
 Vugava – from Vis Island
Žlahtina – from the Island of Krk

Red wines
 Babić
 Crljenak Kaštelanski – also known as Zinfandel
 Dobričić
 Drnekuša
 Plavac mali – includes regional variations Dingač and Postup
 Teran

Dessert wines
 Prošek

Beers
Apart from the great abundance of imported international beers such as Heineken, Tuborg, Gösser, and Stella Artois, homebrewn beers can also be found in Croatia. (Fans already know that the brewery in Split produces Bavarian Kaltenberg beer by licence of the original German brewery.)
 Favorit – brewed in Buzet, Istria
 Kaj – produced in the Croatian region of Podravina by Carlsberg Hrvatska (kaj means "what" in Croatian in Kajkavian dialect)
 Karlovačko – brewed in Karlovac
 Osječko – from Osijek
 Ožujsko – the name referring to the month of March; brewed in Zagreb
 Pan – produced by Carlsberg Hrvatska (formerly known as "Panonska pivovara")
 Staro Češko – Czech beer from Daruvar (home to a Czech minority), brewed in Croatia
 Tomislav – the name referring to King Tomislav; brewed in Zagreb
 Velebitsko – brewed in Pazarište, Gospić
 Vukovarsko – brewed in Vukovar, Syrmia

Liqueurs and spirits

 Drenovac
 Kruškovac – made from pears
 Lozovača
 Maraschino
 Pelinkovac
 Šljivovica
 Travarica
 Vlahovac – made from herbs

Coffee
 Franck

Mineral water
Concerning water quality, Croatian water is greatly appreciated all over the world, and has a leading position in Europe with regard to its water resources. Due to a lack of established industries there has also been no major incidents of water pollution.
 Bistra – produced by Coca-Cola
 Cetina – water from the river Cetina, which flows through the Dalmatian hinterland
 Jamnica – winner of the Paris AquaExpo (the so-called Eauscar) for best mineral water of 2003
 Jana – also belongs to Jamnica, best aromatized mineral water (Eauscar 2004)
 Lipički studenac

Juices
 Badel 1862
 Cedevita – sherbet with vitamin C
 Dona
 Jamnica juices – To sokovi
 Maraska
 Vindija juices – Vindi sokovi

Meat products
 Derma d.d. Varazdin with Derma spices and Derma artificial and natural casings (hogs, sheep, etc.
 Gavrilović high quality meat products
 Koka Varazdin with "Cekin" and "Vindon" brands (Koka is part of the Vindija food corporation)
 Various "PIKs" ( – agricultural industry, usually meat processing), e.g. PIK Vrbovec, PIK Bjelovar, PIK Rijeka, PIK Đakovo

Milk and cheese
 Lura – Dukat milk products
 Vindija – milk products
 Zdenka – cheese

Salts and herbs

 Sea salt from the Island of Pag, from Peninsula of Pelješac Ston, and from Nin near Zadar
 Vegeta – herbal salt produced by Podravka

Fish products
 Mackerel and sardines from the Island of Brač

Travel agents
 Adriatic.hr – Croatian online rentals market with more than 13,000 private-owned holiday accommodation units (apartments, studio apartments, rooms and villas). 
 Croatiatourbook.com
 Split Tours – first private Croatian ferry line company and one on the biggest Dalmatian travel agents
Anna Tours - holiday rentals in Croatia since 1994.

Sweets

 Koestlin – cookies, sweets
 Kraš – chocolates, sweet jars, Domaćica - famous chocolate tea biscuit Bajadera – famous praline, Životinjsko carstvo (Animal Kingdom) - famous chocolates, Kiki - famous caramels, etc.
 Ledo ice cream
 Podravka jams

Other

 Adriatica.net – a leading Croatian online travel agent
 BioGnost – pharmaceuticals and biomedicine
 Bluesun Hotels & Resorts
 Borovo – shoes
 Boškinac – boutique hotel, restaurant and winery in Novalja, Pag
 Croatia baterije – batteries
 Croteam – game making company
 Crotram Končar TVŽ Gredelj – electrocompany of trams and train vehicles
 Crotram – Croatian consortium for production of tramways
 Dubrovnik Riviera Hotels – luxury hotels and resorts in Dubrovnik
 Efke – photographic films, papers, and chemicals
 Generalturist – Croatian travel specialist since 1923
 Ghetaldus – eyewear
 Goto International Split – clothing and underwear
 Hotel International – city hotel in the Zagreb business district
 Hotel Jadran – bed and breakfast hotel in the heart of Zagreb
 HS Produkt – firearms manufacturing company; HS2000, VHS assault rifle
 HUP Zagreb – luxury hotels, business hotels and city hotels in Zagreb
 INA – oil, natural gas and fuel producer
 KONČAR Group – electronics
 Koncern Agram – insurance and bank conglomerate
 LoopTeez – streetwear clothing
 Panorama Zagreb Hotel – hotel in the Zagreb city centre
 Petrokemija – chemical industry
 Pliva – pharmaceutical drugs
 Product-Of-Croatia – database with Croatian products and brands
Rimac Automobili – electric car and technology company
 TOZ-Penkala – biros, coloured crayons
 Tvornica Duhana Rovinj (TDR) – cigarettes
 Uniline – Croatian online travel agent
 Valamar Hotels & Resorts – hotel and resort management company
 Varteks – textiles

See also

 Croatian cuisine

References

 
Brands
Economy of Croatia